The Sumner Group is a sedimentary geologic group of Lower Permian age. It is defined in east-central Kansas and extends into Oklahoma and Nebraska as well as the Colorado subsurface where it is undivided.

See also

 List of fossiliferous stratigraphic units in Kansas
 Paleontology in Kansas

References

Geologic groups of Kansas
Permian System of North America